Exeter St Davids is the principal railway station serving the city of Exeter in Devon, England. It is also served by an alternative route to London Waterloo via Salisbury and branch lines to Exmouth, Barnstaple, and Okehampton. It is currently managed by Great Western Railway and is served by trains operated by Great Western Railway, South Western Railway and CrossCountry.

History

The station was opened on 1 May 1844 by the Bristol and Exeter Railway (B&ER). The station was designed by Isambard Kingdom Brunel and was one of his single-sided stations which meant that the two platforms were both on the eastern side of the line. This side is nearer the city and so very convenient for passengers travelling into Exeter, but did mean that many trains had to cross in front of others.

This was not a significant issue while the station was at the end of the line, but on 30 May 1846 the South Devon Railway (SDR) opened a line westwards towards . A carriage shed was built for the SDR at the south end of the B&ER platform but the goods sheds and locomotive sheds for both companies were to the west, between the station and the River Exe. The SDR was designed to be worked by atmospheric power and an engine house was built on the banks of the river near the locomotive shed. This was only used for its original purpose for about a year but was not demolished until many years later.

The next railway to arrive at St Davids was the Exeter and Crediton Railway on 12 May 1851, the junction of which is to the north of the station at Cowley Bridge Junction. This line was worked by the B&ER and trains were accommodated at the existing platforms. All these railways were built to the  broad gauge, but on 1 February 1862, the  gauge London and South Western Railway (LSWR) brought a line into the station from their own  in Queen Street.

With two gauges and four companies using the single-sided station, it was in need of remodelling. A new double-sided platform opened on the western side of the line and the original up platform at the northern end was closed. The original platforms had all been constructed with individual train sheds covering the tracks, and the opportunity was taken to replace these with one large train shed across all the main tracks and platforms. North of the station was a level crossing and just beyond this an additional goods shed was constructed. Unlike the earlier ones, it was solely for transferring goods between the trains of the two different gauges. These buildings were all designed by Francis Fox, the B&ER engineer, and Henry Lloyd and the work was completed in 1864.

The B&ER was amalgamated with the Great Western Railway on 1 January 1876 and the SDR did the same thing exactly one month later.

The train shed was removed in 1912-13 and the platforms extended northwards towards the level crossing. A second island platform was provided on the west side and this entailed the goods shed being narrowed from two tracks to one at their southern end. The middle island platform was mainly used for LSWR trains while "down" GWR services towards the West Country used the original main platform and the new island platforms. Before Southern Region services to Plymouth were abandoned, passengers could see Plymouth-bound services of the Western Region and Southern Region leaving St Davids in opposite directions. The station has remained largely in this form since, but resignalling works in 1985 saw the ex-LSWR services moved to the main platform so that down ex-GWR line services did not have to cross their path at the south end of the station. A through-line between platforms 1 and 3 was removed at the same time. The new signal box was built on the site of the old atmospheric engine house and replaced three older signal boxes.

Remains of the earlier stations can still be seen. The main façade dates from 1864 and the Great Western Hotel dates from the earliest days, as does the southern section of platform 1. The goods shed opposite platform 6 shows the angle where the southern end was cut back in 1912, and at the northern end, part of the original goods shed still stands beneath later extensions. The 1864 transfer shed can still be seen beside the line beyond Red Cow Crossing; it is now a Grade II listed building.

Station Masters

William Mears ca. 1850 - 1891
Samuel Morris 1891 - 1900 
H.E. Williams 1900 - 1911 (formerly station master at )
W.E. Denton 1922 - 1926
A.J. Humphrey 1926 - 1928 (formerly station master of )
Ernest Tom Evans 1928 - 1938 (formerly station master at )
W.J. Gush 1938 - 1939
William Nicholls 1939 - 1945 (formerly station master at )
F.G. Elmore ca. 1950

Facilities 
The main buffet and bookshop are both outside the ticket gates. There are also a number of local shops outside the station along with the Great Western Hotel and a Premier Inn hotel. There is a smaller buffet on platforms 5 & 6.

The main passenger footbridge has many paintings resembling frescoes and depicting romantic versions of rail travel. A second bridge fitted with lifts provides disabled access. When the lifts are out of use, a member of station staff escorts people across a foot crossing at track level towards the south of the station.

Location

The station entrance is on the east side of the line, facing the city centre which is about a 15 minutes walk. The routes to the centre and Exeter University are well signposted.

Beyond platform six is the Exeter panel signal box that controls not just St Davids but also the main line north through to Taunton & Cogload Junction and southwards to Totnes & Torquay as well the branches out to Exmouth Junction and Crediton. Next to this is Exeter Traincare Depot where DMU sets used on local services are fuelled.  A goods shed is situated beyond Red Cow Crossing at the north end of the platforms, and finally beyond that is Riverside Yard which still sees goods traffic.  Cowley Bridge Junction is about a mile away at the far end of Riverside Yard, but the junction for the Exeter Central line is right by the south end of the platforms. This line curves eastwards and climbs steeply to cross a small viaduct before entering a tunnel beneath the city; the main line instead stays on the level and crosses both the River Exe and the city's flood defence channel before curving gently out of sight.

Platform layout 
The entrance is on platform 1, which is mainly used for trains to and from Exeter Central and Barnstaple. It is signalled so that two trains can be on the platform simultaneously, with the south end marked as platform 1A. At the north end is platform 2, a separate bay platform that is used from time to time for trains to and from the north – mainly Bristol and Barnstaple – that start or terminate at St Davids.

The middle pair of platforms is numbered 3 & 4. The former is used by similar trains to platform 1, but platforms 4-6 do not have access to the lines from Exeter Central. Instead platform 4 is the main platform for inter-city trains to Paignton, Plymouth and Penzance. Trains from both platforms 1 and 3 can also reach this route so trains from Exmouth that continue westwards will reverse in one of these platforms.

The third platform block sees northbound trains to London Paddington and the North use platform 5. Various local services use platform 6 as do trains from Paddington or the North that terminate at Exeter then return northwards.

Services

There are two direct routes from St Davids to London. The main line is generally considered to be the Great Western Railway service to  via , which includes the Night Riviera sleeping car service. Because of this, the station is one of the few that has trains to London departing in opposite directions at either end of the station – those to Paddington leave northwards while those to Waterloo head south but turn eastwards, and start the steep climb to  just outside the station.

London services run hourly between Exeter St Davids and London Waterloo and at least hourly between Exeter St Davids and London Paddington (fast trains every hour, with additional semi-fast trains every other hour stopping at some intermediate stations). The fastest trains between Exeter St Davids and London Paddington take just over 2 hours.

Great Western Railway also runs services to  via , approximately hourly in the mornings and reducing in frequency throughout the day.

These services are roughly hourly for much of the day between Birmingham New Street and Exeter St Davids.

Trains from Exmouth generally continue to Paignton every half hour, providing a cross-Exeter service.

Bus services 
Bus services from the station, operated by Stagecoach South West, include destinations throughout the city, plus Okehampton, Tiverton, Crediton, Bideford and Barnstaple.

Accidents and incidents 
On 4 January 2010, Class 142 diesel multiple unit 142 029 collided with a train comprising two Class 159 diesel multiple units at platform 1. Nine people were injured.

Passenger volume 
Exeter St Davids is the busiest station in Devon, handling around 2,619,776 passengers a year in 2018/19. Comparing the year from April 2007 to that which started in April 2002, passenger numbers increased by 30%.

The statistics cover twelve month periods that start in April.

References

External links

Railway stations in Exeter
Former Great Western Railway stations
Railway stations in Great Britain opened in 1844
Railway stations served by CrossCountry
Railway stations served by Great Western Railway
Railway stations served by South Western Railway
Industrial archaeological sites in Devon
DfT Category C1 stations